This article contains information about the literary events and publications of 1565.

Events
March 1 – Poet and missionary José de Anchieta co-founds Rio de Janeiro.
October – Torquato Tasso enters the service of Cardinal Luigi d'Este at Ferrara.
unknown dates
Philip Neri founds the Biblioteca Vallicelliana in Rome.
Approximate time of composition of the Bannatyne Manuscript.

New books

Prose
Giovanni Battista Giraldi – Hecatommithi
Pierre Pithou – 
Camillo Porzio – La Congiura dei baroni
John Stow – Summarie of Englyshe Chronicles
Bernardino Telesio – De natura juxta propria principia (On the Nature of Things according to their Own Principles)
Joseph Karo – Shulchan Aruch (Code of Jewish Law)

Drama
Jean-Antoine de Baïf – L'Eunuque

Picture 

 Richard Breton – Les songes drolatiques de Pantagruel (The Drolatic Dreams of Pantagruel)

Poetry
See 1565 in poetry

Births
September 28 – Alessandro Tassoni, Italian poet (died 1635)
Unknown dates
Gonzalo de Illescas, Spanish historian (died 1633)
Francis Meres, English author and cleric (died 1647)
Anthony Shirley, English traveler and writer (died 1635)

Deaths
March 17 – Alexander Ales, Scottish theologian (born 1500)
March – Lope de Rueda, Spanish dramatist (born c. 1510)
May 14 – Nicolaus von Amsdorf, German theologian (born 1483)
August 27 – William Rastell, English printer (born 1508)
October 7 – Johannes Mathesius, German theologian (born 1504)
October 22 – Jean Grolier de Servières, French bibliophile (born 1479)
December 13 – Conrad Gessner, Swiss naturalist and bibliographer (born 1516)
Unknown dates
Paolo Pino, Italian painter and writer on art (born 1534)
Benedetto Varchi, Italian poet and historian (born c. 1502)

References

Years of the 16th century in literature